Southmayd (the latter syllable pronounced like "maid") is a city in Grayson County, Texas, United States. The population was 992 at the 2010 census. It is part of the Sherman–Denison Metropolitan Statistical Area.

Geography

Southmayd is located in central Grayson County at  (33.620437, –96.715236), along Texas State Highway 56. Texas State Highway 289 runs north–south through the eastern part of the city.

Demographics

As of the census of 2000, there were 992 people, 343 households, and 281 families residing in the city. The population density was 432.2 people per square mile (166.5/km). There were 371 housing units at an average density of 161.6 per square mile (62.3/km). The racial makeup of the city was 91.13% White, 1.61% African American, 3.23% Native American, 0.30% Asian, 1.41% from other races, and 2.32% from two or more races. Hispanic or Latino of any race were 2.72% of the population.

There were 343 households, out of which 41.4% had children under the age of 18 living with them, 62.1% were married couples living together, 15.2% had a female householder with no husband present, and 17.8% were non-families. 14.3% of all households were made up of individuals, and 5.0% had someone living alone who was 65 years of age or older. The average household size was 2.89 and the average family size was 3.14.

In the city, the population was spread out, with 30.2% under the age of 18, 9.0% from 18 to 24, 32.2% from 25 to 44, 22.5% from 45 to 64, and 6.1% who were 65 years of age or older. The median age was 32 years. For every 100 females, there were 95.3 males. For every 100 females age 18 and over, there were 92.8 males.

The median income for a household in the city was $44,565, and the median income for a family was $44,750. Males had a median income of $31,800 versus $21,083 for females. The per capita income for the city was $16,097. About 7.3% of families and 7.7% of the population were below the poverty line, including 7.9% of those under age 18 and 19.0% of those age 65 or over.

Education
Southmayd is served by the S and S Consolidated Independent School District.

References

Cities in Grayson County, Texas
Cities in Texas